Iwo, Osun in Nigeria has been known for its academic activities both western and Islamic. The city contains nine higher education institutions: two Functional Universities, four under construction, four Functional Polytechnics, four Functional Colleges of Education, four Functional Colleges of Health Technology and one College of Nursing.

Academy
Lanreleke Sports Academy
Rovet Football Academy
Àlàmú Football Academy

Universities 

 Bowen University
 Westland University
 National Open University of Nigeria, Iwo Study Center
 Fortress University
 Mercy Medical University
 American University of Science and Technology
 Al Hiddaya University

Polytechnic 

 Iwo City Polytechnic
 Wolex Polytechnic
 Offer Center Institute of Agriculture

Colleges of Education 

 Federal College of Education
 Al Ummah College of Education

Colleges of Health Technology 

 Royal College of Public Health Technology
 Empire College of Health Technology
 Mercy Medical College of Health Technology

Colleges of Nursing 

 Mercy College of Nursing

References

Iwo
Schools in Osun State